Real Ale Brewing is a regional-sized American brewery founded in 1996 in Blanco, Texas. Their beers can only be found in Texas.

History
The Real Ale Brewing Company was established in 1996 in the basement of an antique store in Blanco, Texas by Philip, Diane and Charles Conner. The Conners sold the brewery to Brad Farbstein in 1998. The brewery relocated in May 2006 to a brand-new facility in Blanco, that allowed increased production from 5,500 barrels a year up to 72,000 barrels a year. The owner credits the local Blanco River as "some of the best brewing water for the styles of beer that we make," making Blanco an ideal location for the brewery.

Local partnerships have included Austin-based Fireman's Texas Cruzer, a BMX cruiser bike manufacturer, for which Fireman's #4 Blonde Ale, perhaps Real Ale's best known beer, is named.

In October 2016 Real Ale Brewing Company announced it was issuing a "precautionary recall" of 11,000 cases due to a potential glass defect.

Mysterium Verum
Mysterium Verum is a line of beers produced by Real Ale Brewing Company in which the beers are aged in barrels. Some of these beers are additionally inoculated with wild yeast and/or bacteria. A list of these beers follows:

Brewers' Cut
In 2012 Real Ale Brewing Company started the Brewers Cut product line. The Brewers' Cut line focuses on developing new recipes to put out to the public, and then relying on customer feedback through social media to determine whether the recipe will be bumped up to a year-round product, a seasonal product, or set with plans to be brewed at a later date again in the Brewers' Cut Series. This is a limited-release product; the releases are as follows:

Awards and recognition
Real Ale Brewing Company was awarded their first Great American Beer Festival Medal in 2010. They received a gold for the Rio Blanco Pale Ale in the English Bitter category. Real Ale Brewing Company was awarded two silver Medals at the 2012 Great American Beer Festival; one for the Fireman's #4 in the Golden/Blond Ale category, and the other for the Hans Pils in the German Pilsner category. In 2011 Real Ale Brewing Company ranked #49 in the Brewer's Association annual list of the top 50 Craft Breweries by sales in volume for the year of 2010. In 2012 Real Ale Brewing Company ranked #45 in the same list for the year of 2011. In 2013, the brewery won silver at the Great American Beer Festival for their Brewers Cut Altbier in the German-Style Altbier category.  In 2014, Real Ale won a gold medial at the Great American Beer Festival for Benedictum from their Mysterium Verum series in the Belgian-Style Lambic or Sour Ale category. In 2019 Real Ale was named as the number 4 best brewery in Texas in the Texas Craft Beer Report published by the analytics organization Hopalytics.

References

External links
Real Ale Brewing Company - Official Real Ale Brewing Company site
 Fireman's Texas Cruzer

Beer brewing companies based in Texas
Companies established in 1996